John Tobin may refer to:

People
 Sir John Tobin (1763–1851), Liverpool merchant 
 John Tobin (dramatist) (1770–1804), author of The Honey Moon
 John F. Tobin (1880–1954), American football player and coach
 Jack Tobin (1892–1969), right fielder in Major League Baseball 
 Jackie Tobin (1921–1982), third baseman and second baseman in Major League Baseball 
 John M. Tobin, Wall Street broker in part representing Cornelius Vanderbilt (see Hiram Bond)
 John Tobin (Nova Scotia politician) (1810–1869), politician in Nova Scotia
 John M. Tobin (politician) (1885–1956), politician in Newfoundland
 John Michael Tobin (1841–1898), American Civil War officer and Medal of Honor recipient
 John Tobin (rugby league) (born 1959), rugby league footballer
 John Tobin (boxer) (born 1963), Grenadian Olympic boxer
 John Tobin (Gaelic footballer) (born 1952), Irish Gaelic football manager and former player
 John M. Tobin Jr. (born 1969), former Boston city councilor
 Jackie Tobin (John Patrick Tobin, 1921–1982), American baseball player
 Tip Tobin (John Martin Tobin, 1906–1983), American baseball player

Ship
 John Tobin (1809 ship)